"America the Beautiful" is a patriotic American song. Its lyrics were written by Katharine Lee Bates and its music was composed by church organist and choirmaster Samuel A. Ward at Grace Episcopal Church in Newark, New Jersey. The two never met.

Bates wrote the words as a poem originally entitled "Pikes Peak". It was first published in the Fourth of July 1895 edition of the church periodical, The Congregationalist. It was at that time that the poem was first entitled "America".

Ward had initially composed the song's melody in 1882 to accompany lyrics to "Materna", basis of the hymn, "O Mother dear, Jerusalem", though the hymn was not first published until 1892. The combination of Ward's melody and Bates's poem was first entitled "America the Beautiful" in 1910. The song is one of the most popular of the many U.S. patriotic songs.

History

In 1893, at the age of 33, Bates, an English professor at Wellesley College, had taken a train trip to Colorado Springs, Colorado, to teach at Colorado College. Several of the sights on her trip inspired her, and they found their way into her poem, including the World's Columbian Exposition in Chicago, the "White City" with its promise of the future contained within its gleaming white buildings; the wheat fields of North America's heartland Kansas, through which her train was riding on July 16; and the majestic view of the Great Plains from high atop Pikes Peak.

On the pinnacle of that mountain, the words of the poem started to come to her, and she wrote them down upon returning to her hotel room at the original Antlers Hotel. The poem was initially published two years later in The Congregationalist to commemorate the Fourth of July. It quickly caught the public's fancy. An amended version was published in 1904.

The first known melody written for the song was sent in by Silas Pratt when the poem was published in The Congregationalist. By 1900, at least 75 different melodies had been written. A hymn tune composed in 1882 by Samuel A. Ward, the organist and choir director at Grace Church, Newark, was generally considered the best music as early as 1910 and is still the popular tune today. Just as Bates had been inspired to write her poem, Ward, too, was inspired. The tune came to him while he was on a ferryboat trip from Coney Island back to his home in New York City after a leisurely summer day and he immediately wrote it down. He composed the tune for the old hymn "O Mother Dear, Jerusalem", retitling the work "Materna". Ward's music combined with Bates's poem were first published together in 1910 and titled "America the Beautiful".

Ward died in 1903, not knowing the national stature his music would attain. Bates was more fortunate, since the song's popularity was well established by the time of her death in 1929. It is included in songbooks in many religious congregations in the United States.

At various times in the more than one hundred years that have elapsed since the song was written, particularly during the John F. Kennedy administration, there have been efforts to give "America the Beautiful" legal status either as a national hymn or as a national anthem equal to, or in place of, "The Star-Spangled Banner", but so far this has not succeeded. Proponents prefer "America the Beautiful" for various reasons, saying it is easier to sing, more melodic, and more adaptable to new orchestrations while still remaining as easily recognizable as "The Star-Spangled Banner". Some prefer "America the Beautiful" over "The Star-Spangled Banner" due to the latter's war-oriented imagery, while others object to the implicit support of slavery and racism in its third verse;  others prefer "The Star-Spangled Banner" because of its war themes. While that national dichotomy has stymied any effort at changing the tradition of the national anthem, "America the Beautiful" continues to be held in high esteem by a large number of Americans, and was even being considered before 1931 as a candidate to become the national anthem of the United States.

Lyrics

Notable performances

Elvis Presley performed it many times in concerts starting in 1976.

Bing Crosby included the song in a medley on his album 101 Gang Songs (1961).

Frank Sinatra recorded the song with Nelson Riddle during the sessions for The Concert Sinatra in February 1963, for a projected 45 single release. The 45 was not commercially issued however, but the song was later added as a bonus track to the enhanced 2012 CD release of The Concert Sinatra.

In 1976, while the United States celebrated its bicentennial, a soulful version popularized by Ray Charles peaked at number 98 on the US R&B chart. His version was traditionally played on New Year's Eve in Times Square following the ball drop.

Barbra Streisand release an official music video footage during Norman Lear's Special in 1982.

During her peak to stardom, R&B singer Mariah Carey sang the song at the 1990 NBA Finals.

Whitney Houston also recorded the song, covering Ray Charles' soulful rearranged version as the b-side to her 1991 rendition of "The Star Spangled Banner".

Three different renditions of the song have entered the Hot Country Songs charts. The first was by Charlie Rich, which went to number 22 in 1976. A second, by Mickey Newbury, peaked at number 82 in 1980. Aretha Franklin performed a rendition before an undisputed audience of 93,173 to open WrestleMania III, a performance meta-critic RJ City called "a lovely version". An all-star version of "America the Beautiful" performed by country singers Trace Adkins, Sherrié Austin, Billy Dean, Vince Gill, Carolyn Dawn Johnson, Toby Keith, Brenda Lee, Lonestar, Lyle Lovett, Lila McCann, Lorrie Morgan, Jamie O'Neal, The Oak Ridge Boys, Collin Raye, Kenny Rogers, Keith Urban and Phil Vassar reached number 58 in July 2001. The song re-entered the chart following the September 11 attacks.

Popularity of the song increased greatly in the decades following 9/11; at some sporting events it was sung in addition to the traditional singing of the national anthem. During the first taping of the Late Show with David Letterman following the attacks, CBS newsman Dan Rather cried briefly as he quoted the fourth verse.

For Super Bowl XLVIII, The Coca-Cola Company aired a multilingual version of the song, sung in several different languages. The commercial received some criticism on social media sites, such as Twitter and Facebook, and from some conservatives, such as Glenn Beck. Despite the controversies, Coca-Cola later reused the Super Bowl ad during Super Bowl LI, the opening ceremonies of the 2014 Winter Olympics and 2016 Summer Olympics and for patriotic holidays.

In 2016, American five-piece girl group Fifth Harmony performed a rendition to honor the United States women's national soccer team on defeating Japan 5–2 in the Final to win the 2015 FIFA Women's World Cup last July at BC Place in Vancouver, British Columbia, Canada before an undisputed AT&T Stadium audience of 101,763 to open WrestleMania 32 in Dallas, Texas.

In 2017, Jackie Evancho released Together We Stand, a disc containing three patriotic songs including "America the Beautiful". The song charted at No. 4 on Billboard's Classical Digital Song sales chart.

An abbreviated cover with the 1911 lyrics was performed by Greg Jong for the soundtrack of the 2020 video game Wasteland 3, and is played during the final hostile encounters in the Denver section.

In 2021, Jennifer Lopez performed the song at the inauguration of Joe Biden, as the second half of a medley with "This Land Is Your Land" by Woody Guthrie.

Idioms
"From sea to shining sea", originally used in the charters of some of the English Colonies in North America, is an American idiom meaning "from the Atlantic Ocean to the Pacific Ocean" (or vice versa). Other songs that have used this phrase include the American patriotic song "God Bless the U.S.A." and Schoolhouse Rock's "Elbow Room". The phrase and the song are also the namesake of the Shining Sea Bikeway, a bike path in Bates's hometown of Falmouth, Massachusetts. The phrase is similar to the Latin phrase "" ("From sea to sea"), which is the official motto of Canada.

"Purple mountain majesties" refers to the shade of Pikes Peak in Colorado Springs, Colorado, which inspired Bates to write the poem. The idiom inspired the Colorado Rockies to have purple as one of its team colors.

In 2003, Tori Amos appropriated the phrase "for amber waves of grain" to create a personification for her song "Amber Waves". Amos imagines Amber Waves as an exotic dancer, like the character of the same name portrayed by Julianne Moore in Boogie Nights.

Books
Lynn Sherr's 2001 book America the Beautiful discusses the origins of the song and the backgrounds of its authors in depth. The book points out that the poem has the same meter as that of "Auld Lang Syne"; the songs can be sung interchangeably. Additionally, Sherr discusses the evolution of the lyrics, for instance, changes to the original third verse written by Bates.

Melinda M. Ponder, in her 2017 biography Katharine Lee Bates: From Sea to Shining Sea, draws heavily on Bates's diaries and letters to trace the history of the poem and its place in American culture.

See also 

 "God Bless America"

Notes

References

External links

 MP3 and RealAudio recordings available at the United States Library of Congress
 
 Words, sheet music & MIDI file at the Cyber Hymnal
 America the Beautiful Park in Colorado Springs named for Katharine Lee Bates' words.
 Archival collection of America the Beautiful lantern slides from the 1930s.
 Another free sheet music

1895 songs
American Christian hymns
American patriotic songs
Pikes Peak
History of Colorado Springs, Colorado
Songs based on poems
Grammy Hall of Fame Award recipients
Concert band pieces
Ray Charles songs
Whitney Houston songs